Warningcamp is a clustered village and larger, semi-wooded mid-size civil parish in the Arun District of West Sussex, England. It is centred  ENE of Arundel, on the east bank of the River Arun.  The south-east quarter of the parish is woodland.

History
A medieval chapelry community of the parish of Lyminster, it contained 119 inhabitants in 1848.

Contemporary description
Local historian Mary Barber wrote in 2002 that:

The Monarch's Way long-distance footpath passes through the village close to the former youth hostel.  The parish has many footpaths and rises from 2m above mean high tide at the River Arun to 68m above Ordnance Datum along some of its north edge.

References

External links
 Civil parish council website

Villages in West Sussex
Arun District